Kim Mu-yeol (born May 22, 1982) is a South Korean actor. Following a successful career in musical theatre, Kim was first cast in minor parts on film and television. But after getting good reviews in his supporting roles in The Scam (2009) and War of the Arrows (2011), Kim landed his first major role in Jung Ji-woo's critically acclaimed film A Muse (2012), followed by a leading role in the independent film All Bark No Bite.

Career
Kim Mu-yeol debuted as a musical theatre actor, and among the roles he's played on stage are child murderers Richard/Nathan in Thrill Me and gambler Sky Masterson in Guys and Dolls. He won Best Actor at the 2009 Korea Musical Awards for his portrayal of Melchior in Spring Awakening, a rock musical which dealt with such taboo subjects as teenage pregnancy, sexual and physical abuse, and homosexuality.

While acting on stage, Kim was cast in minor roles on television and film, and in 2009 he gained notice with a supporting role as a bond broker who is the brains behind The Scam. Period action epic War of the Arrows became one of the biggest hits of 2011 and further raised his profile. In 2012, Kim rose to stardom after the release of the provocative and psychologically rich A Muse, in which he played a conflicted novelist.

Kim returned to acting upon his military discharge in 2014. He starred in Northern Limit Line in 2015, a naval thriller about the Second Battle of Yeonpyeong.

He was cast as leading man in Bad Guys.

Military service
In June 2012, Kim came under growing public criticism over allegations he dodged his compulsory military service. In a report released by the Korean Board of Audit and Inspection (BAI), Kim was deemed fit to serve in active duty as a level two recruit after a March 2001 physical examination. However, throughout 2007 to 2009, Kim was granted postponement on the grounds that he was taking civil service examinations or had been admitted to a work training facility, neither of which took place. In December 2009, he received his final notice for enlistment, having used up the 730 days allowed for postponement. He submitted a request to change his military status in January 2010 because of a knee injury, which was rejected. Finally, a valid exemption was granted on the grounds that he was a "low-income individual" and the sole provider for his family. BAI's contention was that Kim's income is substantially higher than the standard for disqualification due to poverty; thus, the Military Manpower Administration was negligent in their duties by granting the exemption.

Kim’s agency Prain TPC defended him, stating that Kim had been supporting his family by working as a security guard, construction worker, and at a mobile phone factory since his late teens. When his father collapsed from a cerebral hemorrhage and was diagnosed with cancer in 2008, the treatments incurred a lot of debt for the family. Their worsening financial condition caused them to become totally dependent on Kim, resulting in his said filing for an exemption in 2010.

Given the publicity, a reinvestigation into the case was launched and Kim was asked by the production company to leave the film 11 A.M. (he was replaced by Choi Daniel).

On October 4, 2012, Kim released a statement that though there was no wrongdoing on his part, he had decided to voluntarily enter the army "to recover his honor damaged by the rumors."

In January 2013, Kim starred in military musical The Promise. It was co-produced by the Ministry of National Defense and Korea Musical Theatre Association, to commemorate the 60th anniversary of the signing of the armistice. It ran from January 9 to 20 at the National Theater of Korea, with a cast composed of actors Ji Hyun-woo and Jung Tae-woo, as well as singers Leeteuk of Super Junior, Yoon Hak of Supernova, and Lee Hyun of 8Eight. The musical centered around a group of soldiers who keep a promise made to each other during the 6.25 war. When the "entertainment soldiers" unit was disbanded in August 2013, Kim was reassigned to a frontline combat unit of the 12th Infantry Division headquartered in Inje County, Gangwon Province.

In February 2014, Kim underwent surgery to treat a cartilage injury in his left knee, and afterwards received rehabilitation treatment for nearly two months at a military hospital near Seoul. Criticism was raised regarding his lengthy sick leave, but the defense ministry refused to provide detailed information regarding Kim's health condition, arguing that it was an infringement on his privacy.

Kim was discharged on July 8, 2014.

Personal life
After a romantic tweet that Kim meant to be a private message to Yoon Seung-ah was accidentally posted on the actor’s Twitter page, their agencies confirmed in February 2012 that the two were dating. Kim and Yoon married on April 4, 2015.

In December 2022, their agency announced that Yoon is pregnant with the couple's first child and expected to give birth in June 2023.

Filmography

Film

Television

Web series

Theater

Discography

Awards and nominations

References

External links

21st-century South Korean male actors
South Korean male musical theatre actors
South Korean male stage actors
South Korean male film actors
South Korean male television actors
Sungkyunkwan University alumni
1982 births
Living people